is a district located in Miyagi Prefecture, Japan.

As of 2003, the district has an estimated population of 86,405 and a population density of 201.79 persons per km2. The total area is 428.20 km2.

Towns and villages 
Kawasaki
Murata
Ōgawara
Shibata

Districts in Miyagi Prefecture